McCoy House, also known as the AuClaire School and Gingerbread House, is a historic home located at Kirkwood, New Castle County, Delaware. It was built between 1892 and 1897, and is a 28-room, -story, six-bay, brick house. It features a wraparound verandah, steep gable roof, and is covered in brown glazed tiles imported from Belgium. It is considered one of the most unusual structures in the State of Delaware and reflects the builder's unique expression of the European Arts and Crafts movement.

It was added to the National Register of Historic Places in 1973.

References

External links
 

Historic American Buildings Survey in Delaware
Houses on the National Register of Historic Places in Delaware
Houses completed in 1897
Houses in New Castle County, Delaware
National Register of Historic Places in New Castle County, Delaware